Behrungen is a former municipality in the district Schmalkalden-Meiningen, in Thuringia, Germany. From December 1, 2007, it has been part of the Grabfeld district.

Gallery

References 

Former municipalities in Thuringia
Duchy of Saxe-Meiningen